The Ashbourne line was a  railway  from Buxton via Ashbourne to Uttoxeter. It was built by the London and North Western Railway using a section of the Cromford and High Peak Railway (C&HPR) and it joined the North Staffordshire Railway at Ashbourne, proceeding to Uttoxeter with a junction onto the main line at Rocester.

Origins
Although the country between Buxton and Ashbourne was sparsely populated, and the terrain immensely difficult, there were a number of motivations for its construction. Ashbourne was one of the few large settlements in the area without a railway connection until the North Staffordshire Railway built its branch from the Churnet Valley line in 1852. Meanwhile, a lucrative trade in limestone was building up and the LNWR's only route southwards was through the Manchester area. Finally, and not least, the Midland Railway  was threatening to take over the Derbyshire business through its attempts to reach Manchester from Derby via Buxton.

The LNWR sought to consolidate its position by building a line southwards across the Midland's path. Both railways had arrived at Buxton almost simultaneously in 1863, with termini adjacent to each other (and Buxton lost its chance to be served by a mainline railway).

The LNWR had leased the Cromford and High Peak in 1861 and in 1874 it gained permission to link Buxton with the C&HPR at Hindlow Junction just south of Harpur Hill, which it reached in 1892. At the other end, it would build High Peak Junction near Cromford. After some delay, a further bill was sought in 1887 which, in addition, allowed the complete takeover of the High Peak line. Services began to Parsley Hay on 1 June 1894.

The  section from Parsley Hay to Ashbourne was authorised by the LNWR Act of 4 August 1890, the building contract awarded to Naylor Brothers on 10 December 1895, and it was opened on 4 August 1899. A new Ashbourne station was built jointly by the NSR and the LNWR. The Station Hotel (known as The Beresford Arms for some time, but which has now reverted to its original name) dates from this time.

Construction

Buxton station having been built as a terminus facing north it was first necessary to proceed around a tight 180 degree curve over the 15-arch Hogshaw Viaduct, with a gradient as steep as 1 in 62,  to the station at Higher Buxton. On leaving the town the line passed over 13-arch Dukes Drive Viaduct, and then climbed steadily at 1 in 62 to Beswick's Sidings. The gradient eased from there to  Hindlow, where the line joined the CHPR. This section still exists, serving various lime works at Hindlow and Dowlow.

From there the line fell at 1 in 60 to Hurdlow (for Longnor and Monyash), but then the gradient eased considerably to Parsley Hay, where it left the CH&PR. From there to Ashbourne the line was single, with passing loops at all stations except Thorpe Cloud, and although the line was initially fairly level it included a number of tight curves. The next stop was Hartington, where after about a couple of miles the line began to fall steeply again at 1 in 60 through Alsop en le Dale, Tissington, Fenny Bentley, where there was a goods depot, and Thorpe Cloud, and finally through  Church St tunnel to Ashbourne.

It can be seen that the gradients and curves meant that it was always a difficult line to work, particularly during winter when it was exposed to the elements on the high moors. By contrast, the line from Ashbourne southwards was relatively easy, following river valleys as it did, first the Henmore Brook and then the River Dove.

History
There were regular trains from Ashbourne to Derby.

Baedeker for 1890 gives the following information: Railway from Ashbourne to Derby, 30 M., in 1¼-2 hours (fares 2s.6d., 2s., 1s. 3d.) - 5M Norbury with a highly interesting church (14-15cent; fine stained-glass) and an ancient manor house - At 7M Rocester( rail, refreshment rooms) the pretty 'Churnet Valley line' diverges to the right; the first station on it is (3½M) Alton - 11M Uttoxeter 19M Tutbury - 30M Derby

Once the line to Parsley Hay was open in 1899, there were six trains a day between Buxton and Ashbourne, but the expected expresses were no more than through coaches being attached to London trains. Nevertheless, it was valuable for freight, not only minerals, but milk and other farm produce. Moreover, it became a lifeline during the winter snowstorms: two years after the line opened, a train of six-wheeled carriages became derailed by the snow and was marooned for three days, during which time the crew were given hot food and drinks by local farmers. This camaraderie ensured that the trains would always get through somehow.

Throughout its existence It served townsfolk who wished to explore the countryside, and country folk who wanted to visit town. Regular passenger services finished on 30 October 1954,  but specials and excursions of various kinds continued until 1963. in its last years the line was worked by a LMS Fowler 2-6-2T and 2 coaches.

In the same year, freight traffic finished between Ashbourne and Hartington, to Rocester in 1964, from Hartington to Parsley Hay in October 1967, and to Hindlow the following month.

Preservation
Although all trace of the old NSR lines has practically disappeared, the track bed from Ashbourne to Parsley Hay was acquired by Derbyshire County Council and the Peak National Park for a cycle and walking route. This, the Tissington Trail, was one of the first of such ventures in the country. Later, Ashbourne Tunnel was acquired by Sustrans.

The line is still open from Buxton to Hindlow for stone traffic from the Buxton lime industry and Lafarge Dowlow.

References

External links
One inch to one mile 1947 map
1947 timetable
Geograph photo of Hindlow Tunnel
Geograph photo of 1990 limestone train at Hindlow

Bibliography
 Kingscott, G., (2007) Lost Railways of Derbyshire, Newbury: Countryside Books
 Bentley, J.M., Fox, G.K., (1997) Railways of the High Peak: Buxton to Ashbourne (Scenes From The Past series 32), Romiley: Foxline Publishing

London and North Western Railway
Peak District
Rail transport in Derbyshire
Rail trails in England
Closed railway lines in the East Midlands
Railway lines closed in 1967